The 2004 United States House of Representatives elections were held on November 2, 2004 to elect all 435 seats of the chamber. It coincided with the re-election of President George W. Bush as well as many Senate elections and gubernatorial elections. Prior to the election in the 108th Congress, Republicans held 227 seats, Democrats held 205, with two Republican vacancies and one independent. As a result of this election, the 109th Congress began composed of 232 Republicans, 201 Democrats, one independent (who caucuses with the Democrats), and one vacancy (Democrat Bob Matsui won reelection, but died just two days before the beginning of the 109th Congress.).

Democrats won open seats in Colorado, South Dakota, and New York while ousting incumbents in Georgia and Illinois. Republicans won an open seat in Kentucky and multiple seats in Texas while ousting an incumbent in Indiana. Two seats in Louisiana swapped party control.

, this is the last election in which someone who was not from the Democratic or Republican party was elected to the House (Independent Bernie Sanders). Republicans would not make consecutive net gains in the House (after gaining seats in the 2002 election) until 2020 and 2022. This was also the last election in which the Republicans made any gains in a Presidential election year until 2020.

Results

Federal

|-
! rowspan= 2 colspan=2 | Parties
! colspan=4 | Seats
! colspan=3 | Popular vote
|- style="background-color:#E9E9E9"
! 2002
! 2004
! Netchange
! Strength
! Vote
! %
! Change
|-
| style="background-color:" | 
! Republican Party
| 229
| 232
|  3
| 53.3%
| 55,958,144
| 49.4%
| -0.6%
|-
| style="background-color:" | 
! Democratic Party
| 205
| 202
|  3
| 46.4%
| 52,969,786
| 46.8%
| +1.6%
|-
| style="background-color:" | 
! Libertarian Party
| —
| —
| —
| —
| 1,056,844
| 0.9%
| -0.5%
|-
| style="background-color:" | 
! Independent
| 1
| 1
| 0
| 0.2%
| 674,202
| 0.6%
| +0.1%
|-
| style="background-color:" | 
! Green Party
| —
| —
| —
| —
| 344,549
| 0.3%
| -0.1%
|-
| style="background-color:" | 
! Constitution Party
| —
| —
| —
| —
| 187,006
| 0.2%
| -
|-
| style="background-color:" | 
! Reform Party
| —
| —
| —
| —
| 85,539
| 0.1%
| +0.1%
|-
| style="background-color:" | 
! Independence Party
| —
| —
| —
| —
| 76,053
| 0.1%
| +0.1%
|-
| style="background-color:" | 
! Others
| —
| —
| —
| —
| 1,840,163
| 1.6%
| -0.6%
|-
! colspan=2 | Total
! 434
! 435
! 0
! 100.0%
! 113,192,286
! 100.0%
! –
|- style="background-color:#E9E9E9"
| style="text-align:left" colspan=9 | Source: Election Statistics - Office of the Clerk

Maps

Retirements 
In the November general elections, thirty incumbents did not seek re-election, either to retire or to seek other positions.

Democrats 
Thirteen Democrats did not seek re-election.
 : Cal Dooley retired.
 : Peter Deutsch retired to run for U.S. Senator.
 : Denise Majette retired to run for U.S. Senator.
 : Bill Lipinski retired.
 : Ken Lucas retired.
 : Chris John retired to run for U.S. Senator.
 : Dick Gephardt retired to run for U.S. president.
 : Karen McCarthy retired.
 : Brad Carson retired to run for U.S. Senator.
 : Joe Hoeffel retired to run for U.S. Senator.
 : Aníbal Acevedo Vilá retired to run successfully for Governor of Puerto Rico.
 : Jim Turner retired when redistricted from the 2nd district.
 : Jerry Kleczka retired.

Republicans 
Seventeen Republicans did not seek re-election.
 : Doug Ose retired.
 : Scott McInnis retired.
 : Johnny Isakson retired to successfully run for U.S. Senator.
 : Mac Collins retired to run for U.S. Senator.
 : David Vitter retired to successfully run for U.S. Senator.
 : Billy Tauzin retired.
 : Nick Smith retired.
 : Jack Quinn retired.
 : Amo Houghton retired.
 : Richard Burr retired to successfully run for U.S. Senator.
 : Cass Ballenger retired.
 : James C. Greenwood retired.
 : Pat Toomey retired to run for U.S. Senator.
 : Jim DeMint retired to successfully run for U.S. Senator.
 : Ed Schrock retired.
 : George Nethercutt retired to run for U.S. Senator.
 : Jennifer Dunn retired.

Resignations 
Two seats opened early due to resignations and were not filled until the November elections.

Democrats 
No Democrats resigned.

Republicans 
Two Republicans resigned.
 : Porter Goss resigned September 23, 2004 to become Director of the Central Intelligence Agency.
 : Doug Bereuter resigned August 31, 2004 to become president of The Asia Foundation.

Incumbents defeated

In primary elections

Democrats 
Two Democrats lost renomination.
 : Chris Bell lost renomination to Al Green, who then won the general election.
 : Ciro Rodriguez lost renomination to Henry Cuellar, who won the general election.

Republicans 
No Republicans lost renomination.

In the general election

Democrats 
Five Democrats lost re-election to Republicans.
 : Baron Hill lost to Mike Sodrel.
 : Max Sandlin lost to Louie Gohmert.
 : Nick Lampson lost to Ted Poe.
 : Charles Stenholm lost a redistricting race to Randy Neugebauer.
 : Martin Frost lost a redistricting race to Pete Sessions.

Republicans 
Two Republicans lost re-election to Democrats.
 : Max Burns lost to John Barrow.
 : Phil Crane lost to Melissa Bean.

Open seats that changed parties

Democratic seats won by Republicans 
Three Democratic seats were won by Republicans.
 : Won by Geoff Davis.
 : Won by Charles Boustany.
 : Won by Luis Fortuño.

Republican seats won by Democrats 
Three Republican seats were won by Democrats.
 : Won by John Salazar.
 : Won by Charlie Melancon.
 : Won by Brian Higgins.

Open seats that parties held

Democratic seats held by Democrats 
Democrats held nine of their open seats.
 : Won by Jim Costa.
 : Won by Debbie Wasserman Schultz.
 : Won by Cynthia McKinney.
 : Won by Dan Lipinski.
 : Won by Russ Carnahan.
 : Won by Emanuel Cleaver.
 : Won by Dan Boren.
 : Won by Allyson Schwartz.
 : Won by Gwen Moore.

Republican seats held by Republicans 
Republicans held sixteen of their open seats.
 : Won by Dan Lungren.
 : Won by Connie Mack IV.
 : Won by Tom Price.
 : Won by Lynn Westmoreland.
 : Won by Bobby Jindal.
 : Won by Joe Schwarz.
 : Won by Jeff Fortenberry.
 : Won by Randy Kuhl.
 : Won by Virginia Foxx.
 : Won by Patrick McHenry.
 : Won by Mike Fitzpatrick.
 : Won by Charlie Dent.
 : Won by Bob Inglis.
 : Won by Thelma Drake.
 : Won by Cathy McMorris.
 : Won by Dave Reichert.

Newly created seats 
Of the thirty-two seats created in the 2003 Texas redistricting, three had no incumbent representative.

Democratic gain 
No Democrats were elected in newly created seats.

Republican gain 
Three Republicans were elected in newly created seats.
 : Won by Michael McCaul.
 : Won by Mike Conaway.
 : Won by Kenny Marchant.

Special elections 

There were three special elections held in 2004, all of them separate from the November elections.

Alabama

Alaska

Arizona

Arkansas

California

Colorado

Connecticut

Delaware

Florida

Georgia

Hawaii

Idaho

Illinois

Indiana

Iowa

Kansas

Kentucky

Louisiana 

On December 4, 2004, a run-off election was held to determine the winner of the 3rd and 7th congressional districts. In the 3rd district, Charlie Melancon narrowly defeated Billy Tauzin III. In the 7th district, Charles Boustany defeated Willie Mount. Thus, both seats switched to the opposite party.

Maine

Maryland

Massachusetts

Michigan

Minnesota 

All incumbents were re-elected.

Mississippi

Missouri

Montana

Nebraska

Nevada

New Hampshire

New Jersey

New Mexico

New York

North Carolina

North Dakota

Ohio

Oklahoma

Oregon

Pennsylvania

Rhode Island

South Carolina

South Dakota

Tennessee

Texas

Utah

Vermont

Virginia

Washington 

All seven incumbents who ran for re-election, none of whom faced viable challengers, were returned to Congress. None received less than 60% of the vote, and one received over 80%. In addition, the two seats vacated by retiring Republicans were both reclaimed by Republicans despite Democratic hopes to gain at least one seat in the vulnerable 8th district.

West Virginia

Wisconsin

Wyoming

Non-voting delegates

See also
 2004 United States elections
 2004 United States gubernatorial elections
 2004 United States presidential election
 2004 United States Senate elections
 108th United States Congress
 109th United States Congress

Notes

References

External links
 United States Election 2004 Web Archive from the U.S. Library of Congress